Ribbon Hero 2: Clippy's Second Chance, or just Ribbon Hero 2, is a video game developed by Microsoft Office Labs. The game is available as a free download and serves to educate users of Microsoft Word, Excel, PowerPoint and OneNote in Microsoft Office 2007 and 2010 how to use the ribbon interface. It is a sequel to Ribbon Hero.

Plot
Clippy, one of the Office Assistants which were included in Microsoft Office 97 through 2003, is looking for a part-time job and requires help with his resume.  However, he enters a time machine and is taken to several different time periods. He travels to the Middle Ages, Ancient Egypt, the 1960s, Ancient Greece, the Renaissance period and the future.  In each time period, there are several tasks which must be completed before moving to the next period.  These tasks include formatting documents, inserting graphs and pictures, and other common uses for Microsoft Office products.

References

External links

Educational video games
Microsoft games
Microsoft Office-related software
2011 video games
Video games developed in the United States
Windows games
Windows-only games